The River Dochart is in Perthshire, Scotland.

Coming from Ben Lui, it flows east out of Loch Dochart and through the glen of the same name. At Killin just before it enters Loch Tay are the Falls of Dochart. The river is sometimes also considered to be a part of the upper reaches of the River Tay.

See also
 Inchbuie

External links

 Killin.info community website, guides, photos, media, news.
 YouTube.com video of Killin area featuring the River Dochart.

Dochart
2Dochart